Davis is a city in Garvin and Murray counties in the U.S. state of Oklahoma. The population was 2,683 at the 2010 census.

History
Davis is named after Samuel H. Davis, who moved to Washita in what was then Indian Territory in 1887.  At the time of its founding, the community was located in Pickens County, Chickasaw Nation.

Davis owned a dry goods store, which was four miles south of the current town of Davis. Davis submitted a petition for a Santa Fe depot to be built near his store, and the petition was accepted. In 1890, he also successfully petitioned for a post office to be built. The post office was supposed to be named after Nelson Chigley, a Chickasaw Indian who owned the land on which the town was to be built.  Chigley was already an Indian Territory name, so it was named after Davis. The town was established on November 16, 1898.  It is located 23 miles north of Ardmore and 23 miles south of Pauls Valley.

By 1900, Davis had 57 businesses, two banks, 10 doctors, three dentists, and three lawyers. Cotton farming was a common occupation in Davis, which was in one of the best cotton producing sections in Oklahoma.

Later, when U.S. Interstate 35 was constructed, it was built two miles to the west of Davis.

By the year 2000 the population had grown to 2,610, and very few people worked as farmers. The education, health, and social services sectors of the economy have grown, with approximately one-quarter of the population working in these areas.

Geography
According to the United States Census Bureau, the city has a total area of 11.0 square miles (28.5 km2), all land. It is located near the Lake of the Arbuckles. Davis is at the intersection of US-77 and SH-7. SH-7 east of Davis leads onto SH-7 Spur which, at the intersection with U.S. Route 177, feeds into the western end of the Chickasaw Turnpike.

Demographics

As of the census of 2010, there were 2,683 people, 1,042 households, and 723 families residing in the city. The population density was 237.1 people per square mile (91.5/km2). There were 1,202 housing units at an average density of 109.2 per square mile (42.2/km2). The racial makeup of the city was 80.34% White, 4.56% African American, 10.65% Native American, 0.38% Asian, 0.50% from other races, and 3.56% from two or more races. Hispanic or Latino of any race were 1.03% of the population.

There were 1,042 households, out of which 33.9% had children under the age of 18 living with them, 52.6% were married couples living together, 13.3% had a female householder with no husband present, and 30.6% were non-families. 28.0% of all households were made up of individuals, and 14.9% had someone living alone who was 65 years of age or older. The average household size was 2.45 and the average family size was 2.99.

In the city, the population was spread out, with 26.7% under the age of 18, 8.3% from 18 to 24, 24.8% from 25 to 44, 21.3% from 45 to 64, and 18.9% who were 65 years of age or older. The median age was 37 years. For every 100 females, there were 88.9 males. For every 100 females age 18 and over, there were 80.2 males.

The median income for a household in the city was $28,958, and the median income for a family was $37,100. Males had a median income of $27,266 versus $16,667 for females. The per capita income for the city was $13,604. About 13.0% of families and 14.2% of the population were below the poverty line, including 14.9% of those under age 18 and 12.5% of those age 65 or over.

Arts and culture
The Davis Museum, run by the Arbuckle Historical Society, includes displays on Schools, Churches, Music, Medicine, Dentistry, Civic Organizations, Military, Uniforms, Fire Departments, Police Departments, Railroad, Farm Implements, and Photographs of the area.  The museum is housed in the recently remodeled 1907 Santa Fe Depot, which is on the National Register of Historic Places listings in Murray County, Oklahoma.

The Forgotten Wheels Museum is known for older motorcycles, and also has antique cars, trucks, and all things vintage.

Parks and recreation
Turner Falls Park in Davis is home to Oklahoma's largest waterfall. The park, nearly 1,600 acres, features swimming, hiking, exploring, overnight lodging, and more.

The City of Davis also has a city park with walking trails, picnic areas, playground equipment, and pavilions.

Chickasaw National Recreation Area is approximately nine miles east of town.

Media
Davis and its surrounding counties are served by a weekly local newspaper, The Davis News.

References

External links
 Encyclopedia of Oklahoma History and Culture - Davis
 Davis Chamber of Commerce

Cities in Murray County, Oklahoma
Cities in Garvin County, Oklahoma
Cities in Oklahoma